UAQ may stand for:

Umm al-Quwain, one of the emirates in the United Arab Emirates.
Universidad Autónoma de Querétaro, the Spanish name of the Autonomous University of Queretaro (Mexico).
 the IATA Code for Domingo Faustino Sarmiento Airport, serving San Juan, Argentina